Rolando Cepeda Abreu (born 13 March 1989) is a Cuban male volleyball player. He is part of the Cuba men's national volleyball team. He was one of the key players that contributed to 2015–16 Greek Volleyleague Championship for PAOK VC, making it the first team ever to win a championship in Greece starting from the 4th place in the playoffs. He was named the 2015–16 Greek Volleyleague MVP. He didn't play in Rio Olympics in 2016 for being one of the six players of the Cuban national volleyball team that were remanded into custody suspected of committing aggravated rape in July 2016 in Tampere, Finland. On 20 September 2016 he was sentenced to five years of prison.

Sporting achievements

National Championships/Cups

 2015/2016  Greek Championship, with PAOK

Individual
2013 Cuban Championship – Most Valuable Player
2013 Cuban Championship – Best Scorer 
2013 Cuban Championship – Best Server 
2013 NORCECA Championship – Best Scorer
2014 Pan-American Cup – Most Valuable Player
2015 NORCECA Championship – Best Opposite 
 2016 Greek Championship – Most Valuable Player
 2019 Turkish Championship – Best Spiker
 2019 Turkish Cup – Best Spiker

References

External links
 profile at FIVB.org

1989 births
Living people
Cuban men's volleyball players
Cuban people imprisoned abroad
PAOK V.C. players
Place of birth missing (living people)
Cuban people convicted of rape
Pan American Games medalists in volleyball
Pan American Games silver medalists for Cuba
Prisoners and detainees of Finland
Volleyball players at the 2011 Pan American Games
Medalists at the 2011 Pan American Games
Expatriates in Finland
21st-century Cuban people